This is the fourth season of Hungarian version of The X Factor. The fourth season premiered on 7 September 2013 on the commercial channel RTL Klub. The show was hosted by Lilu and Bence Istenes. The original host Nóra Ördög left the show due to her pregnancy. The line up also changed this year. The only original judge, who returned for season 4 was Péter Geszti. Joined him on the panel Róbert Szikora, Gabi Tóth and Róbert Alföldi.

On 16 December 2012 the show's host Nóra Ördög announced, that the show would be back for its 4th season in 2013. The apply for the auditions started on the same day.

Judges and hosts 

On 29 April the new judges were announced as returning judge Péter Geszti and new judges Róbert Szikora, Gabi Tóth and Róbert Alföldi.  
Miklós Malek confirmed his exit on 16 December 2012. Later Ildikó Keresztes also confirmed, that she will not return to the show for another season. In April Feró Nagy also announced his exit.

On 17 May 2013 RTL Klub confirmed that the new hosts were Lilu and Bence Istenes. The previous host, Nóra Ördög left the show due to her pregnancy.

Auditions 
Auditions began on 25 May 2013. The contestants came in their thousands.

Bootcamp
The Bootcamp was aired on 28 and 29 September.

The contestants sang live for an audience and the judges. The hopefuls chose a song, what they wanted to sing. At the end of the day, the judges revealed the 25 remaining acts for the Judges' Homes. The boys category had an extra, 7th acts. And the judges found out, which category they would be mentoring.

Judges' houses
At this stage of the competition each judge mentored six acts. 25 acts (7 in the boys category) went through for this stage of the show. Each judge had help from a guest judge to choose their final acts.

The thirteen eliminated acts were:
Boys: David Horvath, Kristóf Karapándzsity, Richárd Nagy, Botond Manó Ráduly  
Girls: Melina Molnár, Nóra Nagy, Eszter Olajos  
Over 25s: Zoltán Bátky, Lia Komondi, Nelli Nagyváradi  
Groups: SPEAK UP!, Sunset Strip, Wild Rhythm Smokers

Contestants
Twelve acts go through to this stage of the show.

Key:
 – Winner
 – Runner-up
 – Third Place
 – Withdrew

Results summary

{|
|-
| – mentored by Róbert Alföldi (Girls)
|| – Bottom two
|-
| – mentored by Gabi Tóth (Boys)
| – Most public votes that week
|-
| – mentored by Róbert Szikora (Groups)
|| –  Withdrew 
|-
| – mentored by Péter Geszti (Over 25s)
|}

Live Shows

Week 1 (12–13 October)

 Theme: Songs from the toplists
 Celebrity performer: Gergő Oláh ("Érted élek")
 Group performance: "We Own the Night" and "Valami más"

Judge's vote to eliminate
 Alföldi: MDC
 Szikora: Anikó Eckert 
 Tóth: MDC
 Geszti: MDC

Week 2 (19–20 October)

 Theme: World tour
 Celebrity performer: Anima Sound System ("Wonder")
 Group performance: "Fire with Fire"

Judge's vote to eliminate
 Alföldi: Marcell Tóth
 Tóth: Lili Péterffy
 Szikora: Marcell Tóth
 Geszti: Lili Péterffy

As both acts got 2 votes, they went to deadlock and Marcell Tóth was eliminated.

Week 3 (26–27 October)

 Theme: Autumn legends
 Celebrity performer: Bermuda ("London"), Enikő Muri ("Maradj még!")
 Group performance: "Best Song Ever"

Judge's vote to eliminate
 Alföldi: Anikó Eckert
 Tóth: Lili Batánovics
 Szikora: Anikó Eckert
 Geszti: Anikó Eckert

Week 4 (2–3 November)

 Theme: Quiet songs
 Celebrity performer: Animal Cannibals ("Minden változik") 
 Group performance: "Perfect Day", "Nincs baj! Tűz van!"

Judge's vote to eliminate
 Tóth: ByTheWay
 Szikora: Ákos Csordás
 Alföldi: ByTheWay
 Geszti: Ákos Csordás

As both acts got 2 votes, they went to deadlock and ByTheWay were eliminated.

Week 5 (9–10 November)

 Theme: Divas and Heartbreakers 
 Celebrity performers: Sugarloaf and Csaba Vastag ("Megküzdök érted") 
 Group performance: "When We Stand Together"

Judge's vote to eliminate
 Alföldi: Ádám Szabó
 Tóth: Lili Batánovics 
 Szikora: Lili Batánovics 
 Geszti: Lili Batánovics

Márk Bozsek withdrew this week after deciding he could not commit to the competition. Therefore, ByTheWay returned to the competition.

Week 6 (16–17 November)

 Theme: Brilliance, luster and beauty
 Celebrity performers: Roy & Ádám feat. Maszkura ("Visszasírom"), Adél Csobot ("Forog a film")  
 Group performance: "Éld át"

Judge's vote to eliminate
 Geszti: Fat Phoenix
 Szikora: Tünde Krasznai
 Tóth:  Fat Phoenix
 Alföldi: Fat Phoenix

Week 7 (23–24 November)

 Theme: Mentors Night
 Celebrity performers: Fábián Juli & Zoohacker
 Group performance: "Shine"

Judge's vote to eliminate
 Alföldi: Ádám Szabó
 Tóth: Lili Péterffy
 Szikora: Ádám Szabó
 Geszti: Lili Péterffy

As both acts got 2 votes, they went to deadlock and Lili Péterffy was eliminated.

Week 8 (30 November-1 December)

 Theme: Party anthems
 Celebrity performers: Zséda ("Hétköznapi Mennyország"/"Dance"), Tibor Kocsis ("Új holnap")
 Group performance: "No Worries"

Judge's vote to eliminate
 Tóth: Ádám Szabó
 Alföldi: Ádám Szabó
 Szikora: Ákos Csordás 
 Geszti: Ádám Szabó

Week 9 (7–8 December)
 Theme: Mentor's favourite song & Contestant's favourite song
 Celebrity performers: Beatrice ("8 óra munka"/"Azok a boldog szép napok"), Hooligans ("Mindörökké") 
 Group performance: "Wake Me Up"

Judge's vote to eliminate
 Geszti: Ákos Csordás
 Tóth: Tünde Krasznai
 Szikora: Tünde Krasznai 
 Alföldi: Ákos Csordás

As both acts got 2 votes, they went to deadlock and Ákos Csordás was eliminated.

Week 10 (14/15 December)

Saturday Night 

Theme: One with a surprise duet partner
 Celebrity performers: Első Emelet ("A film forog tovább"), Kistehén Tánczenekar ("Milyen kár")
Duets:
Tünde Krasznai and Nikolas Takács 
ByTheWay and Márk Bozsek  
Dóra Danics and László Dés

Sunday Night 

Theme: Finalist's favourite Hungarian and English, previously performed song, Winner's Song
Celebrity performers: Ildikó Keresztes & Recirquel ("Adj valamit"), Gabi Tóth ("Üdvözöl a Való Világ"), Csaba Vastag & Tibor Kocsis & Gergő Oláh 
Group performance: "Az élet vár", "Csak állj mellém"

References

External links
Official website (in Hungarian)

Hungary 03
Hungarian television shows
2010s Hungarian television series
2013 Hungarian television seasons